The 2019 Atlantic Heritage Cup is the first edition of the Atlantic Heritage Cup, and acts as a qualification tournament for the 2020 CONIFA World Football Cup in Skopje, North Macedonia. Yorkshire were announced as hosts in March 2019, with Parishes of Jersey, Ellan Vannin and Kernow also originally set to participate. All 4 teams are either part of the United Kingdom, or are Crown dependencies. However, Ellan Vannin and Kernow both pulled out for undisclosed reasons, being replaced by Chagos Islands and reducing the tournament to a 3 team format.

Format
The tournament is a round-robin, with each team playing each other once. This means a total of 3 games to be played over 3 days, at two stadiums (Ingfield Stadium, the home of Ossett United, and the CNG Stadium, home of Harrogate Town. The winner was due to be offered a place at the 2020 CONIFA World Football Cup, which in the event was cancelled due to the coronavirus pandemic.

Standings

All times are local.

Results

Top scorers
3 goals

 Tom Harris
 Kieran Lester

2 goals

 Steven Leelah
 Karl Hinds

1 goal

 Luke Watson
 Brodie Litchfield

Controversy
The decision by CONIFA to host the 2020 World Football Cup in Somaliland was met with criticism by some, with James Scott, the president of Parishes of Jersey FC, telling the Jersey Evening Post that he would not accept the place at the final tournament if his side won the Atlantic Heritage Cup. The comments were met with a backlash from CONIFA, who criticised inaccurate reporting and defended the decision to host the World Football Cup in Somaliland.
The hosting of the 2020 World Football Cup was later transferred to Skopje, North Macedonia, with Parishes of Jersey and Chagos Islands due to participate,  before the event was cancelled due to the coronavirus pandemic.

References

Atlantic Heritage Cup
Atlantic Heritage Cup
Atlantic Heritage Cup
CONIFA World Football Cup